Edmondson Park  is a suburb in the South West of Sydney, in the state of New South Wales, Australia. Edmondson Park is located 32 kilometres from the Sydney central business district, in the local government area of the City of Liverpool.

Edmondson Park is part of the South West Growth Centre and is expected to see significant growth and development over the next 10 years.

History

1800s - 1997: Early settlement and military use 
Edmondson Park lies on the Cumberland Plain, originally home to the Darug, Dharawal and Gundungurra Aboriginal language groups.

In the early years of settlement, parts of the Cumberland Plain were turned into pastoral holdings. Large estates were broken up during the 1860s stem rust, which disrupted the grain industry, leading to the popularity of dairying, timber, fruit and wine production by locals instead. By the 1890s, the area was noted for its thick, timbered scrub and open woodlands.

A large section of Edmondson Park includes the former Ingleburn Army Camp north of Campbelltown Road, which was established during World War II in 1939, The site remained active through the Korean War and Vietnam War, and was used for primarily Reservist military functions following the abolition of conscription in 1972. The site was decommissioned in 1997, while part of the site has been retained in the Ingleburn Military Heritage Precinct.

1970 - 1976: Suburb name 
Edmondson Park is named in honour of John Hurst Edmondson, who was awarded the first Australian Victoria Cross medal posthumously for outstanding leadership and bravery in World War II. A former local resident, he completed his training at Ingleburn Army Camp. The name "Edmondson" was first suggested by Gowan Flora MacDonald for the Denham Court estate which includes the present-day suburbs of Edmondson Park and Denham Court. In November 1970, the NSW Geographical Names Board approved the name of "Edmondson Park".

2005 - Present: Rezoning and urban development 
The South West Priority Growth Area was established by the NSW Government in 2005 to plan for urban expansion on Sydney’s fringes. Edmondson Park was the first precinct to be planned and constructed as part of this area, with the suburb rezoned for development in May 2008.  

A large part of the suburb, formerly part of the Ingleburn Army Camp, was purchased from the Department of Defence by Landcom, the NSW Government's land and property development organisation. The site spanned the two adjoining suburbs of Edmondson Park in the north and Bardia in the south, with an area of 827 hectares. Landcom was responsible for the masterplan, development and land release of the area, with the first residential lots sold in 2012. The mixed-use Edmondson Park Town Centre was delivered in partnership with Frasers Property Australia.

Demographics
In the 2021 Census, there were 12,080 people in Edmondson Park, a significant increase from 2,271 in 2016. The most common reported ancestries were Indian 14.8%, Australian 10.9%, Chinese 8.2%, English 7.9% and Nepalese 6.4%. 44.1% of people were born in Australia. The next most common countries of birth were India 8.2%, Nepal 4.7%, and Fiji 4.1%. 32.1% of people spoke only English at home. Other languages spoken at home included Hindi 10.7% and Arabic 4.7%. The most common responses for religion were Catholic 19.6%, Islam 19%, Hinduism 16.5% and No Religion 12.6%.

Commercial area 

The Ed. Square Town Shopping Centre is the main shopping area located adjacent to the Edmondson Park railway station. The shopping centre is located in the mixed-use town centre, and includes Coles, Events Cinema, and iPlay, as well as other shopping, entertainment, dining and service stores. A number of smaller distributed commercial sites are located on Camden Valley Way in the north of the suburb, including the Village Square Shopping Centre.

Transport 
The Edmondson Park railway station opened on 8 February 2015 and is serviced by the T2 Inner West & Leppington Line on the Sydney Trains Network. 

Interline Bus Services operates scheduled buses that connect the suburb with other areas in the south west, including Narellan, Carnes Hill, Casula, Ingleburn and Liverpool. Interline also operate an On Demand bus service from within the suburb to the train station.

Education 

 St Francis Catholic College, K-12 Co-Educational Catholic College
 New primary school in Edmondson Park (opening 2023)
 New high school in Edmondson Park (planned)

References

Suburbs of Sydney
Hume Highway
City of Liverpool (New South Wales)